Meriweather is an English surname.  Notable people with the surname include:
Brandon Meriweather (born 1984), American football player in the National Football League
Joe Meriweather (born 1953), American basketball player

See also
Meriwether (name)

English-language surnames